Panorays is a SaaS-based third-party security risk management platform. It was founded in 2016 and is headquartered in New York, United States.

History 
Matan Or-El and Meir Antar, along with Demi Ben-Ari, created Panorays in 2016 as an automated third-party security risk management platform. In June 2018, Panorays received a $5 million funding round, led by Aleph venture capital. In December 2019, Panorays received $15 million in Series A funding, led by Oak HC/FT and former Palo Alto Networks chief executive officer, Lane Bess.

Technology 
The Panorays platform gives visibility into and control over third-party security risk through a three-pronged approach to risk assessment - automated vendor questionnaires, assessment of a third-party's external attack surface, and the nature and criticality of the business relationship. The platform also checks vendor compliance with multiple regulations, including the European Union’s General Data Protection Regulation (GDPR), California Consumer Privacy Act (CCPA), New York State Department of Financial Services (NYDFS), and automates the Standardized Information Gathering (SIG) and Consensus Assessments Initiative Questionnaires(CAIQ). It continuously monitors and evaluates third-party security risk, helping companies ensure their vendors are in alignment with their security policies, regulations, and risk appetite.

Awards 

 Most Innovative Third-Party Risk Management (TPRM) Solution - InfoSec Award (2020)
 Startup of the Year - ISPG Global Excellence Awards (2019)
 Startup of the Year - Golden Bridge Awards (2018)

References 

Computer security companies
Technology companies established in 2016
Computer security organizations